The 2015 Paris–Roubaix was the 113th edition of the Paris–Roubaix one-day race. It took place on 12 April and was the tenth race of the 2015 UCI World Tour. It was won by John Degenkolb in a sprint ahead of Zdeněk Štybar and Greg Van Avermaet. Degenkolb became only the second German to win the race, after Josef Fischer's victory at the first edition 119 years earlier.

Route
After a short, neutralised section, the race began in Clairoix. The first  or so were virtually flat and quiet, before the riders hit the 27 cobbled sections that totalled , the hardest being the Trouée d'Arenberg, Mons-en-Pévèle and the Carrefour de l'Arbre. Three sections (Quiévy, Saint-Python and Verchain-Maugré) were included in stage 4 of the 2015 Tour de France, held three months later. The last  were held on the Roubaix Velodrome.

Cobbled sectors

Teams
As Paris-Roubaix was a UCI World Tour event, all 17 UCI WorldTeams were invited automatically and were obliged to send a squad. Eight Professional Continental teams received wildcard invitations and thus completed the 25-team peloton.

Pre-race favourites
Two former multiple winners of the event missed the race due to injury. Four time winner Tom Boonen was ruled out after dislocating his shoulder in a crash during Paris–Nice in March, whilst three-time winner Fabian Cancellara missed out after fracturing two vertebrae in his lower back in a crash at E3 Harelbeke.

Alexander Kristoff was tipped by as the favourite to win the race, having won three stages and the general classification of the Three Days of De Panne, the Tour of Flanders and Scheldeprijs in the fortnight leading up to the race. Defending champion Niki Terpstra also showed good form, having been runner up to Kristoff in the Tour of Flanders and also placing second in Gent–Wevelgem a week earlier.

Former Tour de France winner Bradley Wiggins was riding the event as his final race for  before moving to his new  squad to begin his preparations for a return to track racing at the 2016 Summer Olympics. He was expected to share leadership of Sky with Geraint Thomas, winner of E3 Harelbeke, and Ian Stannard, winner of Omloop Het Nieuwsblad. Other likely contenders for victory included Sep Vanmarcke, the runner up in the 2013 edition of the race, John Degenkolb, the runner up of the 2014 edition, Lars Boom who won Stage 5 of the 2014 Tour de France which featured some of the Paris–Roubaix cobble sectors, Greg Van Avermaet and Peter Sagan.

Results

Controversy

The race was marred by controversy when it emerged that dozens of cyclists had unsafely crossed a level crossing while the barriers were down. Further cyclists were only stopped from crossing when a police motorcyclist intervened. Seconds later, an SNCF TGV high-speed train passed through the crossing.

The SNCF called for police to take action following the incident, stating that there could easily have been a tragedy.

References

External links

Paris–Roubaix
Paris-Roubaix
Paris-Roubaix
Paris-Roubaix